Mongolian may refer to:

 Something of, from, or related to Mongolia, a country in Asia
 Mongolian people, or Mongols
 Mongolia (1911–24), the government of Mongolia, 1911–1919 and 1921–1924
 Mongolian language
 Mongolian alphabet
 Mongolian (Unicode block)
 Mongolian cuisine
 Mongolian culture

Other uses
 Mongolian idiocy, now more commonly referred to as Down syndrome

See also 
 
 Languages of Mongolia
 List of Mongolians
 Mongolian nationalism (disambiguation)
 Mongolian race (disambiguation)
 Mongoloid (disambiguation)

Language and nationality disambiguation pages